AE Pictoris is an eclipsing binary star system in the southern constellation of Pictor. This dim, blue-white hued point of light is just barely visible to the naked eye; it has an apparent visual magnitude of 6.09, which drops to magnitude 6.14 during an eclipse. The system is located around 1,430 light years away from the Sun based on parallax, and it is receding with a radial velocity of 34 km/s.

This is a single-lined spectroscopic binary system with an orbital period of 2.97 days and an eccentricity of 0.10. It is classed as a probable eclipsing binary variable (EB:), but with some uncertainty regarding the specific type. This is a candidate runaway star system, having a peculiar velocity of  relative to its neighbors. The visible component is a B-type main-sequence star with a stellar classification of B3V. it is 28 million years old with seven times the mass of the Sun. The star is radiating 2,569 times the luminosity of the Sun from its photosphere at an effective temperature of 18,700 K.

References

B-type main-sequence stars
Beta Lyrae variables
Spectroscopic binaries
Runaway stars

Pictor (constellation)
Durchmusterung objects
046792
031068
2410
Pictoris, AE